Kidnap is a 2008 Indian Hindi-language action thriller film starring Sanjay Dutt, Imran Khan, Minissha Lamba and Vidya Malvade which was directed by Sanjay Gadhvi, who earlier directed the hit films Dhoom (2004) and Dhoom 2 (2006).

Plot

Sonia Raina (Minissha Lamba) lives with her mother, Mallika Raina (Vidya Malvade) and maternal grandmother Jaya (Reema Lagoo); her parents had divorced when she was ten. A fortnight before her eighteenth birthday, she picks an argument with her mother about her coming home late after the Christmas Party. Her mother tells her to stay within limits and arrive home in time. She is reluctant to abide by the rule and after much negotiation demands that she would listen to everything if she gets to meet her father. Then she leaves home and goes swimming in the sea to vent out. Far into the sea, she vanishes underwater.
She wakes up in the evening in a cottage which has no exit. At first she doesn't believe that she has been abducted and thinks that her friends are playing a prank on her. The abductor tells her how she came there. When she went swimming in the open sea, he pulled her below the water surface and knocked her unconscious using a bottled chloroform.

Meanwhile, everyone is worried at her home. Next morning, her mother receives a call from the abductor wherein he says that he is interested in speaking to Sonia's father, Vikrant Raina (Sanjay Dutt), a New York-based Indian business tycoon, with whom he has an old score to settle.

Vikrant is introduced as a cruel and heartless but a very wealthy man, worth USD 51.7 billion. He is in India because he believes someone has emptied a large share of his money. Mallika meets him and tells him that Sonia has been abducted and that the abductor wants to speak only to him.

It's around 3 p.m. when the abductor calls again. Vikrant and Sonia speak to each other for the first time in eight years. The abductor tells Vikrant that the emptied money is safe in his account. Vikrant wants to know the reason behind the kidnapping. The abductor tells him that he has to do a few things as ransom to release his daughter. The very first of them is saying "Sorry" to Sister Margaret whom he would find on a train from Panvel at 4 pm. Vikrant thinks of it as a crazy idea to reach there in half an hour. But the abductor tells him that she has a clue of how they can meet. Vikrant is determined to reach the place by 4 p.m. and he has to overcome unwarranted circumstances. Sister Margaret hands over a piece of paper which has a poem written on it. Vikrant knows there is something in it so he involves a detective Irfan (Rahul Dev) who has solved many corporate kidnapping cases successfully in the past.

But the abductor is interested in playing a dangerous game with Vikrant. He is asked to perform daring tasks which would reward him with a clue to identify the abductor and the motive of abduction. At the same time the abductor starts to lose control emotionally with Sonia but stays away from her.

On the other hand, it is hard to believe for Sonia that she has been abducted. Initially the abductor is good with her but when she tries to stab him by pretending to flirt with him and hurts his leg, he becomes furious, corners her and manhandles her, but remembers that this is not his aim and leaves her, but not without tying her up.

Once Sonia realises that the abductor is probably frustrated but not a bad human being she gets a little comfortable with him. She subsequently realises that she is being kept in a bungalow which was once owned by her father. On inquiring further, the abductor reveals that several years earlier Vikrant had falsely accused him of kidnapping Sonia when in fact he was trying to save his injured friend by escorting him to the hospital in a car he tried to steal. Consequently, he spent his formative years in jail where he underwent undue mental and physical torture and suffered pangs of revenge for 15 years. He was simply out to get even with Vikrant by kidnapping her for real, so that he could teach Vikrant a lesson, because his friend suffered a huge injury, while Sister Margaret was forced to leave the place and retire. Sonia realizes she knows the abductor, and empathizes with him.

Meanwhile, based on the clues he already has, Vikrant figures out that his daughter's kidnapper is actually Kabir Devendra Sharma (Imran Khan), who he realizes he had wrongly framed for "intentionally" hurting Sonia, blinded both by love for his daughter and his power of wealth, when in fact the two kids were actually unintentionally hurt after they crashed the stolen car into a tree. Meanwhile, unable to reach Vikrant over the phone, Kabir decides to pay him a visit. As planned, Vikrant and Irfan intercept him and a chase ensues. Eventually, Kabir leads Vikrant to Sonia. After meeting Sonia briefly, Vikrant is told to dismiss Irfan from the case and he hands Vikrant the task to free a prisoner from jail. Vikrant follows the command and succeeds in saving the prisoner who, it turns out, is Kabir's friend who he wanted to save, but shortly after the assignment, Irfan intervenes and shoots Kabir, who has already bidden farewell to his friend. Angered, Vikrant threatens Irfan to stay away from now on.

An injured Kabir is nursed by Sonia when he reaches the bungalow. Despite having an opportunity, she does not escape, due to a fit of Stockholm Syndrome as she feels he has been gravely wounded. Based on the clue Vikrant receives after freeing the prisoner from jail, he figures out Sonia's location. On reaching his old bungalow, he does not find Sonia or Kabir, but instead discovers the next clue that requires Vikrant to murder someone at a New Year's Eve party. After much deliberation Vikrant commits the murder and realises that he murdered Kabir. While Vikrant is guilty and pensive at the turn of events, Kabir emerges alive. Kabir makes him realise that Vikrant is a criminal himself even though he committed the crimes to rescue Sonia. Kabir then asks Vikrant to reflect on his past and decide for himself if Kabir was a criminal who deserved imprisonment or a teenager who was unduly penalised for an innocent mistake. After Vikrant apologises to him, Kabir disappears and his jacket leads Vikrant to the final clue which leads him to his daughter.

The Raina family is reunited and enjoying at a gathering. At the gathering, Kabir pays a surprise visit to Sonia and apologises for the trouble he put her through, while revealing that he has now started working for a software company. Both Kabir and Sonia wish each other good luck and part ways.

Cast

 Sanjay Dutt as Vikrant Raina, Mallika's husband, Sonia's father
 Imran Khan as Kabir Devendra Sharma, Sonia's kidnapper
 Minissha Lamba as Sonia "Soni" Raina, Vikrant and Mallika's daughter
 Rahul Dev as Inspector Irfan, A tough cop assigned on the kidnapping case
 Vidya Malvade as Mallika Raina, Vikrant's wife, Sonia's mother
 Sheela David (Sharma) as Sister Margaret, the ex-headmistress of the orphanage where Kabir lived 
 Rushita Pandaya as Junior Sonia Raina
 Reema Lagoo as Jaya, Sonia's maternal grandmother
 Raj Zutshi as Mahesh Verma, Vikrant's rival in business
 Sophie Choudry in a special appearance in the item number Meri Ek Ada Shola
 Sonia Kapoor in a special appearance
 Ankita Makwana in a friendly appearance as Tisha, Sonia's friend.
 Bhupindder Bhoopii as Rahul Dev's Officer

Release

Box office
Kidnap was released on 3 October 2008.
Raw Box Office Net Collections:  Rs. 217.2 million (2008) 
Adjusted Net:  Rs. 252.7 million 
Kidnap Box Office Gross:  Rs. 300.7 million (2008) 
Adjusted Gross:  Rs. 349.9 million 
Overseas:  $120,000 (USA),   £365,000 (UK)  
after four weeks
 and was not expected to recover its Rs 400 million budget.

Awards
Nominated:
IIFA Best Villain Award Imran Khan

Critical reception
Kidnap received generally poor reviews from critics. Elvis D'Silva of rediff gave the movie 2 stars out of 5, criticising the performances of Sanjay Dutt and Minissha Lamba. 
Gaurav Malani of Indiatimes Movies gave the movie 2.5 stars, praising the story line and climax. 
Taran Adarsh gave the movie 2 stars out of 5, criticising the script as one "that easily ranks amongst the worst of 2008" while praising the performance of Imran Khan. 
Abhishek Mande of Buzz18 rated the movie 2/5, describing it as "seriously funny."
Kidnap did better than Goldie Behl's Drona which came out the same day.

Soundtrack

The music was composed by Pritam and Sandeep-Sanjeev and the lyrics were written by Mayur Puri for all songs apart from "Mit Jaaye", which was by Sandeep Vyas.

References

External links
 
 

2000s Hindi-language films
2008 films
Films directed by Sanjay Gadhvi
2008 crime thriller films
Indian crime thriller films
Films featuring songs by Pritam
Films about child abduction in India
Indian films with live action and animation